Serinyà is a village in the province of Girona and autonomous community of Catalonia, Spain, with a population of 1,143 inhabitants (2021)

References

External links
 Government data pages 

Municipalities in Pla de l'Estany